Ryan Cartwright (born 14 March 1981) is an English actor.

Early life
Cartwright was born on 14 March 1981 in Erdington, Birmingham, West Midlands. He has an older brother, Che Cartwright, who is also an actor.

Career
He began acting with the Central Junior Television Workshop. His first major role came at the age of 15 in the British ITV comedy-drama The Grimleys. He has also appeared in such other British television programmes as Seriously Weird, Hardware, Donovan, Microsoap, Look Around You and All About Me.

Since moving to the US, Cartwright had a recurring role on the television series Bones as the laboratory intern Vincent Nigel-Murray, until the death of his character in the season 6 episode The Hole in the Heart. He also completed filming a Hallmark Channel television film, Dear Prudence alongside Jane Seymour, in which he used an American accent. He had a recurring role (as upper class Briton John Hooker) on Season 3 of Mad Men.

He played Gary Bell, an autistic character, on the Syfy television series Alphas (2011–2012). To prepare for the role, Cartwright consulted with people who worked with autistic people, watched documentaries, read blogs created by autistic people, and books from autistic authors, such as Temple Grandin and Daniel Tammet. Cartwright's portrayal of Bell has earned praise from the neurological science community, crediting his complexity for eschewing stereotypes of autism previously displayed in mass media.

In September 2016, Cartwright began a main role in the CBS sitcom Kevin Can Wait as Chale Witt. On 12 May 2018, the series was canceled after two seasons.

Personal life
Cartwright has lived in Los Angeles since 2006.

Filmography

Film

Television

References

External links
 
 

1981 births
Living people
People from Erdington
English expatriates in the United States
English male film actors
English male television actors
Male actors from Birmingham, West Midlands